The First Battle of the Marne was a battle of the First World War fought from 5 to 12 September 1914. It was fought in a collection of skirmishes around the Marne River Valley. It resulted in an Entente victory against the German armies in the west. The battle was the culmination of the Retreat from Mons and pursuit of the Franco-British armies which followed the Battle of the Frontiers in August and reached the eastern outskirts of Paris.

Field Marshal Sir John French, commander of the British Expeditionary Force (BEF), began to plan for a full British retreat to port cities on the English Channel for an immediate evacuation. The military governor of Paris, Joseph Simon Gallieni, wanted the Franco–British units to counter-attack the Germans along the Marne River and halt the German advance. Entente reserves would restore the ranks and attack the German flanks. On 5 September, the counter-offensive by six French armies and the British Expeditionary Force (BEF) began.

By 9 September, the success of the Franco–British counteroffensive left the German 1st and 2nd Armies at risk of encirclement, and they were ordered to retreat to the Aisne River. The retreating armies were pursued by the French and British. The German armies ceased their retreat after  on a line north of the Aisne River, where they dug in on the heights and fought the First Battle of the Aisne.

The German retreat from 9 to 13 September marked the end of the attempt to defeat France by crushing the French armies with an invasion from the north through Belgium and in the south over the common border. Both sides commenced reciprocal operations to envelop the northern flank of their opponent, in what became known as the Race to the Sea which culminated in the First Battle of Ypres.

Background

Battle of the Frontiers 

The Battle of the Frontiers is a general name for all the operations of the French armies from  A series of encounter battles began between the German, French and Belgian armies on the German-French frontier and in southern Belgium on 4 August. Liège was occupied by the Germans on 7 August. The first units of the British Expeditionary Force (BEF) landed in France and French troops crossed the German frontier. The Battle of Mulhouse (Battle of Alsace ) was the first French offensive of World War I. The French captured Mulhouse, until forced out by a German counter-attack on 11 August, and fell back toward Belfort. On 12 August, the Battle of Haelen was fought by German and Belgian cavalry and infantry, resulting in a Belgian defensive success. The BEF completed its move of four divisions and a cavalry division to France on 16 August, as the last Belgian fort of the Fortified Position of Liège surrendered. The Belgian government withdrew from Brussels on 18 August.

The main French offensive, the Battle of Lorraine , began with the Battles of Morhange and Sarrebourg advances by the First Army on Sarrebourg and the Second Army towards Morhange. Château-Salins near Morhange was captured on 17 August and Sarrebourg the next day. The German 6th and 7th Armies counter-attacked on 20 August, and the Second Army was forced back from Morhange and the First Army was repulsed at Sarrebourg. The German armies crossed the border and advanced on Nancy, but were stopped to the east of the city. The Belgian 4th Division, the solitary part of the Belgian army not to retreat to the defensive lines around Antwerp, dug in to defend Namur, which was besieged on 20 August. Further west, the French Fifth Army had concentrated on the Sambre by 20 August, facing north on either side of Charleroi and east towards Namur and Dinant. Additional support was given to the Belgians at Namur by the French 45th Infantry Brigade. On the left, the Cavalry Corps of General Sordet linked up with the BEF at Mons.

To the south, the French retook Mulhouse on 19 August and then withdrew. By 20 August 1914, a German counter-offensive in Lorraine had begun and the German 4th and 5th Armies advanced through the Ardennes on 19 August towards Neufchâteau. An offensive by the French Third and Fourth Armies through the Ardennes began on 20 August in support of the French invasion of Lorraine. The opposing armies met in thick fog; the French mistook the German troops for screening forces. On 22 August, the Battle of the Ardennes  began with French attacks, which were costly to both sides and forced the French into a disorderly retreat late on 23 August. The Third Army recoiled towards Verdun, pursued by the 5th Army, and the Fourth Army retreated to Sedan and Stenay. Mulhouse was recaptured again by German forces and the Battle of the Meuse  caused a temporary halt of the German advance.

The Great Retreat

That evening, the  troops at Namur withdrew into French-held territory and at Dinant, 674 men, women and children were summarily executed by Saxon troops of the German 3rd Army; the first of several civilian massacres committed by the Germans in 1914.

At the Battle of Mons (23 August), the BEF attempted to hold the line of the Mons–Condé Canal against the advancing German 1st Army. The British were eventually forced to withdraw due to being outnumbered by the Germans and the sudden retreat of the French Fifth Army, which exposed the British right flank. Though planned as a simple tactical withdrawal and executed in good order, the British retreat from Mons lasted for two weeks and covered .  During the retreat, BEF commander Sir John French began to make contingency plans for a full retreat to the ports on the English Channel followed by an immediate British evacuation. On 1 September Lord Kitchener, the British Secretary of State for War, met with French (and French Prime Minister Viviani and War Minister Millerand), and ordered him not to withdraw to the Channel. The BEF retreated to the outskirts of Paris, before it counter-attacked in concert with the French, in the Battle of the Marne.

The French First and Second Armies had been pushed back, by attacks of the German 7th and 6th Armies between St. Dié and Nancy. The Third Army held positions east of Verdun against attacks by the German 5th Army; the Fourth Army held positions from the junction with the Third Army south of Montmédy, westwards to Sedan, Mezières, and Fumay, facing the German 4th Army; the Fifth Army was between Fumay and Maubeuge; the Third Army was advancing up the Meuse valley from Dinant and Givet, into a gap between the Fourth and Fifth Armies and the Second Army pressed forward into the angle between the Meuse and Sambre, directly against the Fifth Army. On the far west flank of the French, the BEF prolonged the line from Maubeuge to Valenciennes against the German 1st Army and Army Detachment von Beseler masked the Belgian army at Antwerp.

On 26 August, German forces captured Valenciennes and began the Siege of Maubeuge  Leuven, (Louvain) was sacked by German troops and the Battle of Le Cateau was fought by the BEF and the First Army. Longwy was surrendered by its garrison and next day, British marines and a party of the Royal Naval Air Service (RNAS) landed at Ostend; German troops occupied Lille and Mezières. Arras was occupied on 27 August and a French counter-offensive began at the Battle of St. Quentin (Battle of Guise  On 29 August, the Fifth Army counter-attacked the German 2nd Army south of the Oise, from Vervins to Mont-d'Origny and west of the river from Mont-d'Origny to Moy towards St. Quentin on the Somme, while the British held the line of the Oise west of La Fère. German troops captured Laon, La Fère, and Roye on 30 August and Amiens the next day. On 1 September, the Germans entered Craonne and Soissons. On 5 September German troops reached Claye-Souilly,  from Paris, captured Reims, and withdrew from Lille, and the BEF ended its retreat from Mons. Also on that day, French troops counterattacked in the Battle of the Ourcq , marking the end of the Great Retreat of the western flank of the Franco-British armies.

In the east, the Second Army had withdrawn its left flank, to face north between Nancy and Toul; the First and Second Armies had slowed the advance of the German 7th and 6th Armies west of St. Dié and east of Nancy by 4 September. There was a gap between the left of the Second Army and the right of the Third Army at Verdun, which faced north-west, on a line towards Revigny, against the Fifth Army advance west of the Meuse between Varennes and Sainte-Menehould. The Fourth Army had withdrawn to Sermaize, westwards to the Marne at Vitry-le-François and crossed the river to Sompons, against the German 4th Army, which had advanced from Rethel to Suippes and the west of Châlons. The new French Ninth Army held a line from Mailly against the German 3rd Army, which had advanced from Mézières, over the Vesle and the Marne west of Chalons. The Second Army had advanced from Marle on the Serre, across the Aisne and the Vesle, between Reims and Fismes to Montmort, north of the junction of the French 9th and 5th Armies at Sézanne.

The Fifth Army and the BEF had withdrawn south of the Oise, Serre, Aisne, and Ourq, pursued by the German 2nd Army on a line from Guise to Laon, Vailly, and Dormans and by the 1st Army from Montdidier, towards Compiègne and then south-east towards Montmirail.

French garrisons were besieged at Metz, Thionville, Longwy, Montmédy, and Maubeuge. The Belgian army was invested at Antwerp in the National Redoubt and Belgian fortress troops continued the defence of the Liège forts. The Military governor of Paris, General Joseph Gallieni, was tasked with the defence of the city.

Plans

In the first days of September, the final decisions were made that were to directly create the circumstances for the Battle of the Marne. On 2 September Moltke issued a Grand Directive changing the order of battle for the German attack. Moltke ordered that Paris would now be bypassed and the sweep intended to encircle the city would now seek to entrap the French forces between Paris and Verdun. To accomplish this, the 2nd Army would become the primary striking force with the 1st Army (Alexander von Kluck) following in echelon to protect the flank. At the time of this Grand Directive, Moltke based his decision on an intercepted radio transmission from the 2nd Army to the 1st Army describing the Entente retreating across the Marne. On the eve of this most important battle, Moltke had requested situation reports from the 1st Army on 1 September but received none. Both armies on the western flank had been depleted by the march and August battles. Moltke chose to reinforce the opposite wing that was attacking fortifications in the region near Verdun and Nancy.

Kluck, whose army on the western flank had formerly been the force that would deliver the decisive blow, disregarded these orders. Together with his Chief of Staff General Kuhl, Kluck ordered his armies to continue south-east rather than turning to the west to face possible reinforcements that could endanger the German flank. They would seek to remain the wing of the German attack and to find and destroy the French Fifth Army's flank. After setting this order in action on 2 September, Kluck did not transmit word to Moltke and OHL until the morning of 4 September, which Moltke ignored. Though in keeping with the pre-war tradition of decentralised command, Kluck disregarded the threat from the west. On 31 August, 1 September and 3 September, German aviators reported columns of French troops west of the 1st Army. These reports were dismissed and not passed to the IV Reserve Corps.

Joffre sacked General Charles Lanrezac, the commander of the Fifth Army and replaced him with I Corps commander Louis Franchet d'Espèrey. D'Esperey became one of the originators of the Entente plan during the Battle of the Marne. On 4 September, while meeting with the British General Henry Wilson, d'Esperey outlined a French and British counter-attack on the German 1st Army. The counter-attack would come from the south by d'Esperey's Fifth Army, the west from the BEF and at the Ourq River from Gallieni's new Sixth Army. Gallieni had come to the same conclusion on 3 September and had started marching the Sixth Army east.

Joffre spent much of this afternoon in silent contemplation under an ash tree. At dinner that night he received word of d’Esperey's plan for the counter-attack. That night he issued commands to halt the French retreat in his Instruction General No. 5, to start on 6 September. The BEF was under no obligation to follow orders of the French. Joffre first attempted to use diplomatic channels to convince the British government to apply pressure on Sir John French. Later in the day, he arrived at the BEF HQ for discussions which ended with Joffre banging his hand dramatically on a table while shouting "Monsieur le Maréchal, the honour of England is at stake!" Following this meeting, Sir John French agreed to the operational plan to commence the following day.

Battle

Western flank

Late on 4 September, Joffre ordered the Sixth Army to attack eastwards over the Ourcq towards Château Thierry as the BEF advanced towards Montmirail, and the Fifth Army attacked northwards with its right flank protected by the Ninth Army along the St. Gond marshes. On 5 September, the Battle of the Ourcq commenced when the Sixth Army advanced eastwards from Paris. That morning it came into contact with cavalry patrols of the IV Reserve Corps of General Hans von Gronau, on the right flank of the 1st Army west of the Ourcq River. Seizing the initiative in the early afternoon, the two divisions of IV Reserve Corps attacked with field artillery and infantry into the gathering Sixth Army and pushed it back.

Gronau ordered the II Corps to move back to the north bank of the Marne, which began a redeployment of all four 1st Army corps to the north bank which continued until 8 September. The swift move to the north bank prevented the Sixth Army from crossing the Ourcq. In this move against the French threat from the west, von Kluck ignored the Franco-British forces advancing from the south against his left flank and opened a  gap in the German lines between the 1st Army and the 2nd Army on its left (east). Entente air reconnaissance observed German forces moving north to face the Sixth Army and discovered the gap. The lack of coordination between von Kluck and Bülow caused the gap to widen further. On the night of September 7, Bülow ordered two of his corps to withdraw to favorable positions just hours before von Kluck ordered these same two corps to march to reinforce 1st Army on the Ourcq River. At exactly the same time, von Kluck and his influential staff officer Hermann von Kuhl had decided to break the French Sixth Army on the 1st Army's right flank while Bülow shifted an attack to the 2nd Army's left wing, the opposite side from where the gap had opened.

The Allies were prompt in exploiting the break in the German lines, sending the BEF and the Fifth Army into the gap between the two German armies. The right wing of the Fifth Army attacked on 6 September and pinned the 2nd Army in the Battle of the Two Morins, named for the two rivers in the area, the Grand Morin and Petit Morin. The slow pace of the BEF's advance enraged  d'Esperey and other French commanders. On 6 September Haig's forces moved so slowly they finished the day 12 km behind their objectives and lost only seven men. The BEF, though outnumbering Germans in the gap ten to one, advanced only forty kilometers in three days. The Fifth Army by 8 September crossed the Petit Morin, which forced Bülow to withdraw the right flank of the 2nd Army. The next day, the Fifth Army recrossed the Marne, and the German 1st and 2nd Armies began to retire. The Germans had still hoped to smash the Sixth Army between 6 and 8 September, but the Sixth Army was reinforced on the night of 7/8 September by  reserve infantry ferried from Paris. This included about 3,000 men from the Seventh Division who were transported in a fleet of Paris taxicabs requisitioned by General Gallieni. During the critical period of 6 to 7 September von Moltke issued no orders to either von Kluck or Bülow, and received no reports from them between 7 and 9 September.

On 6 September, General Gallieni gathered about six hundred taxicabs at Les Invalides in central Paris to carry soldiers to the front at Nanteuil-le-Haudouin, fifty kilometres away. In the night of 6-7, two groups set off: the first, comprising 350 vehicles, departed at 10 PM, and another of 250 an hour later. Each taxi carried five soldiers, four in the back and one next to the driver. Only the back lights of the taxis were lit; the drivers were instructed to follow the lights of the taxi ahead. Most of the taxis were demobilised on 8 September but some remained longer to carry the wounded and refugees. The taxis, following city regulations, dutifully ran their meters. The French treasury reimbursed the total fare of 70,012 francs.

The arrival of six thousand soldiers by taxi has traditionally been described as critical in stopping a possible German breakthrough against the 6th Army. However, in General Gallieni's memoirs, he notes how some had "exaggerated somewhat the importance of the taxis." In 2001, Strachan described the course of the battle without mentioning taxis and in 2009, Herwig called the matter a legend: he wrote that many French soldiers travelled in lorries and all the artillery left Paris by train. It was also the first large-scale use of motorised infantry in battle; a Marne taxicab is prominently displayed in the exhibit on the battle at the Musée de l'Armée at Les Invalides in Paris.

The reinforced Sixth Army held its ground. The following night, on 8 September, the Fifth Army launched a surprise attack against the 2nd Army, further widening the gap between the 1st and 2nd Armies. Moltke, at OHL in Luxembourg, was effectively out of communication with the German army HQs. He sent his intelligence officer, Oberstleutnant Richard Hentsch to visit the HQs. On 8 September, Hentsch met with Bülow, and they agreed that the 2nd Army was in danger of encirclement and would retreat immediately. On 9 September, Hentsch reached the 1st Army's HQ, met with von Kluck's chief of staff, and issued orders for the 1st Army to retreat to the Aisne River. von Kluck and von Kuhl vigorously objected to this order as they believed their army was on the verge of breaking the Sixth Army. However, Hentsch reminded them he had the full power of the OHL behind him, and that 2nd Army was already in retreat. Von Kluck reluctantly ordered his troops to pull back.

Moltke suffered a nervous breakdown upon hearing of the danger. His subordinates took over and ordered a general retreat to the Aisne, to regroup for another offensive. The Germans ceased their retreat after , at a point north of the Aisne River, where they dug in, preparing trenches. By 10 September the German armies west of Verdun were retreating towards the Aisne. Joffre ordered Entente troops to pursue, leading to the First Battle of the Aisne (see below).

The German retreat from 9–13 September marked the end of the Schlieffen Plan. Moltke is said to have reported to the Kaiser: "Your Majesty, we have lost the war.".

Eastern flank

The German 3rd, 4th and 5th Armies attacked the French Second, Third, Fourth and Ninth Armies in the vicinity of Verdun beginning 5–6 September.

German attacks against the Second Army south of Verdun from 5 September almost forced the French to retreat. South-east of Verdun, the Third Army was forced back to the west of Verdun by German attacks on the Meuse Heights, but maintained contact with Verdun and the Fourth Army to the west.

Other fighting included the capture of the village of Revigny in the Battle of Revigny, the Battle of Vitry around Vitry-le-François, and the Battle of the Marshes of Saint-Gond around Sézanne. On 7 September German advances created a salient south of Verdun at St. Mihiel, which threatened to separate the Second and Third Armies. General Castelnau prepared to abandon the French position around Nancy, but his staff contacted Joffre, who ordered Castelnau to hold for another 

German attacks continued through 8 September but soon began to taper off as Moltke began shifting troops to the west. By 10 September the Germans had received orders to stop attacking and withdrawal towards the frontier became general.

Aftermath

Analysis
At the start of the war, both sides had plans that they counted on to deliver a short war. The Battle of the Marne was the second great battle on the Western Front, after the Battle of the Frontiers, and one of the most important events of the war. While the German invasion failed decisively to defeat the Entente in France, the German army occupied a good portion of northern France as well as most of Belgium and it was the failure of the French Plan 17 that caused that situation. It is generally agreed among historians that the battle was an Entente victory that saved Paris and kept France in the war but there is considerable disagreement as to the extent of the victory.

Joffre, whose planning had led to the disastrous Battle of the Frontiers, was able to bring the Entente to a tactical victory. He used interior lines to move troops from his right wing to the critical left wing and sacked generals. Due to the redistribution of French troops, the German 1st Army had 128 battalions facing 191 battalions of the French and BEF. The 2nd and 3rd German armies had 134 battalions facing 268 battalions of the French Fifth and new Ninth Army. It was his orders that prevented Castelnau from abandoning Nancy on 6 September or reinforcing that army when the pivotal battle was unfolding on the other side of the battlefield. He resisted counter-attacking until the time was right then put his full force behind it. D'Esperey should also receive credit as the author of the main stroke. As Joffre says in his memoirs: "it was he who made the Battle of the Marne possible".

The German retreat ended their hope of pushing the French beyond the Verdun–Marne–Paris line and winning a quick victory. Following the battle and the failures by both sides to turn the opponent's northern flank during the Race to the Sea, the war of movement ended with the Germans and the Entente Powers facing each other across a stationary front line. Both sides were faced with the prospect of costly siege warfare operations if they chose to continue an offensive strategy in France.

Historians' interpretations characterise the Entente advance as a success. John Terraine wrote that "nowhere, and at no time, did it present the traditional aspect of victory", but nonetheless stated that the French and British stroke into the breach between the 1st and 2nd German Armies "made the battle of the Marne the decisive battle of the war". Barbara W. Tuchman and Robert A. Doughty wrote that Joffre's victory at the Marne was far from decisive, Tuchman calling it an "…incomplete victory of the Marne…" and Doughty [the] "…opportunity for a decisive victory had slipped from his hands". Ian Sumner called it a flawed victory and that it proved impossible to deal the German armies  "a decisive blow". Tuchman wrote that Kluck explained the German failure at the Marne as

Richard Brooks in 2000, wrote that the significance of the battle centres on its undermining of the Schlieffen Plan, which forced Germany to fight a two-front war against France and Russia—the scenario that its strategists had long feared. Brooks claimed that, "By frustrating the Schlieffen Plan, Joffre had won the decisive battle of the war, and perhaps of the century". The Battle of the Marne was also one of the first battles in which reconnaissance aircraft played a decisive role, by discovering weak points in the German lines, which the Entente armies were able to exploit.

Casualties
Over two million men fought in the First Battle of the Marne and although there are no exact official casualty counts for the battle, estimates for the actions of September along the Marne front for all armies are often given as ca. 500,000 killed or wounded. French casualties totalled  of whom 31,376 were killed. Some notable people died in the battle, such as Charles Péguy, who was killed while leading his platoon during an attack at the beginning of the battle. According to Roger Chickering, German casualties for the 1914 campaigns on the Western Front were 500,000. No future battle on the Western Front would average so many casualties per day.

In 2009, Herwig re-estimated the casualties for the battle. He wrote that the French official history, gave 213,445 French casualties in September and assumed that ca. 40 % occurred during the Battle of the Marne. Using the German , Herwig recorded that from  the 1st Army had 13,254 casualties, the 2nd Army had 10,607 casualties, the 3rd Army had 14,987 casualties, the 4th Army had 9,433 casualties, the 5th Army had 19,434 casualties, the 6th Army had 21,200 casualties and the 7th Army had 10,164 casualties. Herwig estimated that the five German Armies from Verdun to Paris had 67,700 casualties during the battle and assumed 85,000 casualties for the French. Herwig estimated 300,000 casualties for all sides at the Marne but questioned whether isolating the battle was justified. In 2010, Ian Sumner wrote that there were 12,733 British casualties, including 1,700 dead.

Subsequent operations

First Battle of the Aisne, 13–28 September

On 10 September, Joffre ordered the French armies and the BEF to advance and for four days, the Armies on the left flank moved forward and gathered up German stragglers, wounded and equipment, opposed only by rearguards. On  Joffre ordered outflanking manoeuvres by the armies on the left flank but the advance was too slow to catch the Germans, who ended their withdrawal on 14 September, on high ground on the north bank of the Aisne and began to dig in. Frontal attacks by the Ninth, Fifth, and Sixth Armies were repulsed from  This led Joffre to transfer the Second Army west to the left flank of the Sixth Army, the first phase of Entente attempts to outflank the German armies in "The Race to the Sea".

French troops had begun to move westwards on 2 September, using the undamaged railways behind the French front, which were able to move a corps to the left flank in  On 17 September, the French Sixth Army attacked from Soissons to Noyon, at the westernmost point of the French flank, with the XIII and IV corps, which were supported by the 61st and 62nd divisions of the 6th Group of Reserve Divisions. After this, the fighting moved north to Lassigny and the French dug in around Nampcel.

The French Second Army completed a move from Lorraine and took over command of the left-hand corps of the Sixth Army, as indications appeared that German troops were also being moved from the eastern flank. The German IX Reserve Corps arrived from Belgium by 15 September and the next day joined the 1st Army for an attack to the south-west, with the IV Corps and the 4th and 7th cavalry divisions, against the attempted French envelopment. The attack was cancelled and the IX Reserve Corps was ordered to withdraw behind the right flank of the 1st Army. The 2nd and 9th Cavalry divisions were dispatched as reinforcements the next day but before the retirement began, the French attack reached Carlepont and Noyon, before being contained on 18 September. The German armies attacked from Verdun westwards to Reims and the Aisne at the Battle of Flirey  –  cut the main railway from Verdun to Paris and created the St. Mihiel salient, south of the Verdun fortress zone. The main German effort remained on the western flank, which was revealed to the French by intercepted wireless messages.

Race to the Sea

From  –  the belligerents made reciprocal attempts to turn the northern flank of their opponent. By the next day, French attacks north of the Aisne led Falkenhayn to order the 6th Army to repulse the French and secure the flank. The French advance at the First Battle of Picardy  met a German attack rather than an open flank and by the end of the Battle of Albert  the Second Army had been reinforced to eight Corps but was still opposed by German forces at the Battle of Arras  rather than advancing around the German northern flank. The German 6th Army had also found that on arrival in the north, it was forced to oppose the French attack rather than advance around the flank and that the secondary objective, to protect the northern flank of the German Armies in France, had become the main task. By 6 October, the French needed British reinforcements to withstand German attacks around Lille. The BEF had begun to move from the Aisne to Flanders on 5 October and reinforcements from England assembled on the left flank of the Tenth Army, which had been formed from the left flank units of the 2nd Army on 4 October.

The Entente Powers and the Germans attempted to take more ground after the "open" northern flank had disappeared.  The Franco-British attacks towards Lille in October at the battles of La Bassée, Messines and Armentières (October–November) were followed up by attempts to advance between the BEF and the Belgian army by a new French Eighth Army. The moves of the 7th and then the 6th Army from Alsace and Lorraine had been intended to secure German lines of communication through Belgium, where the Belgian army had sortied several times, during the period between the Great Retreat and the Battle of the Marne; in August, British marines had landed at Dunkirk. In October, a new 4th Army was assembled from the III Reserve Corps, the siege artillery used against Antwerp, and four of the new reserve corps training in Germany.  A German offensive began by 21 October but the 4th and 6th Armies were only able to take small amounts of ground, at great cost to both sides at the Battle of the Yser  and further south in the First Battle of Ypres ( – ).  Falkenhayn then attempted to achieve a limited goal of capturing Ypres and Mont Kemmel.

See also

 Order of battle of the First Battle of the Marne
 World War I casualties
 La Ferté-sous-Jouarre memorial
 Second Battle of the Marne

Footnotes

Bibliography

Further reading

 
 
 
 

Battle honours of the Rifle Brigade
Battle honours of the King's Royal Rifle Corps
Marne 1
Marne 1
Marne 1
Marne 1
Marne 1
1914 in France
September 1914 events